Rob Cowan (born 14 April 1948) is an English music broadcaster and writer.

Employed by music publisher Boosey & Hawkes for nineteen years in various capacities, his first record review was published in 1967. He edited CD Review for four years from 1985, and has also contributed reviews to Gramophone, Classic Record Collector and The Independent. He was a co-presenter with jazz and classical music writer Keith Shadwick on Classic FM CD review programme. In September 1992, he was responsible for early radio plays of what became a best-selling recording (with soprano soloist Dawn Upshaw) of Henryk Górecki's Third Symphony.

After presenting CD Masters on Radio 3 for several years (the other host was Jonathan Swain), he had a spell as co-presenter of the Radio 3 Breakfast programme from 2007. He subsequently presented Radio 3's Essential Classics alongside Sarah Walker and Sunday Morning alongside James Jolly. He also appeared on Radio 3's CD Review.

In December 2017, he returned to Classic FM to present a Saturday evening programme.

Cowan has been married since 1971 and has two adult daughters.

References

External links
 "Rob's Retro Classical - Blog site
 Rob Cowan on Classic FM

1948 births
Living people
BBC Radio 3 presenters